Ebadat-e Yek (also Romanized as ‘Ebādāt-e Yek; also known as Hanţalīyeh, Ḩoneyţīyeh, and Khanţalīyeh) is a village in Gazin Rural District, Raghiveh District, Haftgel County, Khuzestan Province, Iran. At the 2006 census, its population was 116, in 23 families.

References 

Populated places in Haftkel County